Tricholosporum is a genus of fungi in the family Tricholomataceae. It was circumscribed by Mexican mycologist Gastón Guzmán in 1975.

See also

List of Tricholomataceae genera

References

External links

 
Agaricales genera